The deltoid ligament (or medial ligament of talocrural joint) is a strong, flat, triangular band, attached, above, to the apex and anterior and posterior borders of the medial malleolus. 
The deltoid ligament is composed of 4 fibers:
1. Anterior tibiotalar ligament
2. Tibiocalcaneal ligament
3. Posterior tibiotalar ligament
4. Tibionavicular ligament.
It consists of two sets of fibers, superficial and deep.

Superficial fibres
Of the superficial fibres, 
 tibionavicular pass forward to be inserted into the tuberosity of the navicular bone, and immediately behind this they blend with the medial margin of the plantar calcaneonavicular ligament; 
 tibiocalcaneal descend almost perpendicularly to be inserted into the whole length of the sustentaculum tali of the calcaneus; 
 posterior tibiotalar from the posterior colliculus of the medial malleolus to the posteromedial surface of the talus

Deep fibres
The deep fibres (anterior tibiotalar) are attached from the anterior colliculus of the medial malleolus to the medial talus and medial tubercle

Coverings
The deltoid ligament is covered by the tendons of the tibialis posterior and flexor digitorum longus which are supplied by the tibial nerve (L4, L5, S1, S2, and S3).

Additional Images

References

External links
 
 
 http://www.ithaca.edu/faculty/lahr/LE2000/ankle%20pics/5medankle-new.jpg 

 Thompson, Jon C. Netter's concise atlas of orthopaedic anatomy. Icon Learning Systems, 2002. 349-351

Ligaments of the lower limb
Lower limb anatomy